Raila Kerkelä (née Hovi; born 13 June 1941 in Vehkalahti) is a Finnish orienteering competitor. She received two medals at the 1966 World Orienteering Championships in Fiskars, a bronze medal in the individual contest (won by Ulla Lindkvist, 35 participants), and a silver medal in the relay with the Finnish team. She received a bronze medal in the relay event at the 1968 World Orienteering Championships in Linköping, together with Pirjo Seppä and Tuula Hovi.

See also 
 List of orienteers
 List of orienteering events

References 

1941 births
Living people
People from Hamina
Finnish orienteers
Female orienteers
Foot orienteers
World Orienteering Championships medalists
Sportspeople from Kymenlaakso